Diaprepesilla is a genus of moths in the family Geometridae.

Species
 Diaprepesilla flavomarginaria (Bremer, 1864)

References
 Diaprepesilla at Markku Savela's Lepidoptera and Some Other Life Forms
 Natural History Museum Lepidoptera genus database

Ennominae